This is a list of football (soccer) clubs in Nicaragua categorised by region and the divisions they play in

Primera División
 Chinandega FC
 CD Walter Ferretti
 Deportivo Ocotal
 Diriangén FC
 Juventus Managua
 Managua F.C.
 Real Estelí
 Real Madriz FC
 UNAN Managua

Segunda División
 Lianziur Organica Masatepe
 San Francisco de Diriamba
 FC San Marcos
 Mina Limon FC
 FC Caritas Sports
 Nandasmo
 Bethel Matagalpa
 Brumas Jinotega
 Salem Tipitapa
 AC Chile Diria
 Real Xolotlan

Nicaraguan Third Division

Grupo A
 Real Esteli Segunda
 FC Junior
 Juventus Santa Theresa
 Deportivo Masaya
 Real Muymuy
 Real Fraternidad

Grupo B
 FC Esteli
 Deportivo Jalapa
 ACS Niquinohomo
 Deportivo Fox Villa
 AC River
 Los Cedros

Former Clubs
 América Managua
 Bluefields
 Flor de Caña FC
 Masatepe
 Santa Cecilia
 Scorpión FC
 VCP Chinandega
 Xilotepelt

External links
 http://lusaco.blogspot.com.au/

Nicaragua
 

Football clubs
Football clubs